The Short Type 166 was a 1910s British two-seat reconnaissance, bombing and torpedo-carrying folder seaplane, designed by Short Brothers.

Development
The Short Type 166 was designed as a 'folder' aircraft to operate from the Ark Royal as a torpedo-bomber. Six aircraft, known within Shorts as the Type A, were originally ordered before the outbreak of World War I, and were assigned the Admiralty serial numbers 161 to 166. As was normal at the time, the type was designated the Admiralty Type 166, after the naval serial number of the last aircraft in the batch. Sometimes, the aircraft are referred to as the Short S.90 (S.90 was the manufacturer's serial number of the first aircraft, naval serial 161).

The Type 166 was similar to the earlier Short Type 136, but slightly larger, and was designed from the start as a torpedo carrier, although it was never used in that rôle.

Design
The Type 166 was a two-bay biplane with twin wooden pontoon floats, with a water rudder fitted to the tail float, plus a stabilizing float mounted near the wingtip under each lower wing. It was powered by a nose-mounted 200 hp (149 kW) Salmson engine.

A follow-on order for 20 aircraft was assembled by Westland Aircraft at its Yeovil factory. The Westland-built aircraft did not have provision for a torpedo, but could carry three 112 lb bombs, and were fitted to carry radio equipment. There was also a Lewis gun in the rear cockpit, that was operated by the observer.

Operators

Hellenic Navy

Royal Naval Air Service

Specifications

See also

References

Notes

Bibliography

Flight International 1956

External links

Short Admiralty Type 166 at flyingmachines.ru

1910s British bomber aircraft
Floatplanes
Type 166
Biplanes
Single-engined tractor aircraft
Aircraft first flown in 1916